Academia Desportiva Manthiqueira Futebol, more commonly referred to as Manthiqueira, is a Brazilian football club based in Guaratinguetá, São Paulo. The team compete in Campeonato Paulista Segunda Divisão, the fourth tier of the São Paulo state football league. The club was formerly known as Associação Desportiva Manthiqueira.

History
The club was founded on August 4, 2005, as Associação Desportiva Manthiqueira, and moved to Guaratinguetá city in late 2010, adopting the name Academia Desportiva Manthiqueira Futebol.

Players

First-team squad

Stadium
Academia Desportiva Manthiqueira Futebol play their home games at Estádio Municipal Professor Dario Rodrigues Leite, commonly known as Ninho da Garça. The stadium has a maximum capacity of 15,769 people.

References

Association football clubs established in 2005
Football clubs in São Paulo (state)
2005 establishments in Brazil